Maurice Kyle (8 November 1937 – 16 January 1981) was an English footballer who played for Oxford United, Southend United, Worcester City and Bath City. During his spell at Oxford, he played 275 league games, and he is seventh highest in the overall list of appearances. Although joining Oxford United in 1959, his transfer didn't officially go through until 1962 when the team joined The Football League.

References

External links
Rage Online profile

1937 births
1981 deaths
English footballers
Association football defenders
Southend United F.C. players
Oxford United F.C. players
Worcester City F.C. players
Bath City F.C. players
English Football League players